Peter Alexandrovich Polovtsov, (Tsarskoye Selo – 9 April 1964 Monte Carlo) was a Russian Tsarist General.

Peter was the son of Alexander Polovtsov.

Peter escaped from Russia in February 1918 with the aid of the British agents Ranald MacDonell and Edward Noel. He was provided with the passport of Reverend Jesse Yonan, an American missionary, and travelled in disguise from Tbilisi to Baku on the Transcaucasus Railway. They travelled on a train escorted by 10,000 armed troops of the Bolshevik Red Army. Noel's involvement in this came to light when he was held captive by the Jangalis in March 1918, and was used to pressurise MacDonell, then in Baku, to desist from trying to topple the Baku Commune.

References

1874 births
1964 deaths
People from Pushkin, Saint Petersburg
People from Tsarskoselsky Uyezd
Imperial Russian Army generals
Russian Provisional Government generals
Freemasons of the Grand Lodge of France
Orientalists from the Russian Empire
Saint Petersburg Mining University alumni
Russian military personnel of the Russo-Japanese War
Russian military personnel of World War I
White Russian emigrants to France
Recipients of the Order of St. Anna, 3rd class
Recipients of the Order of St. George
Recipients of the Order of St. Vladimir, 3rd class
Recipients of the Order of St. Vladimir, 4th class